Argyle is a village in the town of Argyle in Washington County, New York, United States. It is part of the Glens Falls Metropolitan Statistical Area. The village population was 306 at the 2010 census. The Village and Town are named after Argyllshire, Scotland (now Argyll and Bute, Scotland). Many of the original settlers came from Scotland and settled here in the mid-1700s. German, Irish, Dutch, and Polish settlers were also attracted to this area. The 1800s found Argyle residents active in the Underground Railroad and abolitionist movement. The Moses Kill provided waterpower for mills in the village. The early 1900s brought a library and running water to residents, who proudly served their country in times of war. Today, the village is considered home by the descendants of these folks and newcomers alike.

Some notable community events include a Memorial Day parade led by Argyle American Legion Post 1518, an annual 4th of July parade and chicken barbeque hosted by the Argyle Fire-Rescue Department, an Argyle Methodist Church Election Dinner, a Thanksgiving Holiday meal provided by F.E.A.S.T (Friends Ensuring A Super Thanksgiving) for those wishing to enjoy a traditional thanksgiving meal, a book fair by the Argyle Free Library on July 4th, the Carl Lufkin Memorial Pull for the Cure - a Garden Tractor and 4WD truck pull in July which raises money for several charities helping in the fight against cancer, a haunted house on weekends in October at the Ransom Stiles house, and a town-wide garage sale over the Columbus Day Holiday.   On 18 September 2021, Argyle honored its Scottish heritage with a Thistle (national flower of Scotland) Day community celebration after a nearly 100 year hiatus. A parade, chicken and pork barbeques, craft and farmers markets, a concert, and fireworks were part of the day's events.

History 
The village was eventually formed from lands designated in the Argyle Patent of 21 May 1764, located in Albany County within the British Colonial Province of New York. After the American Revolutionary War Argyle was part of Washington County which had been renamed to honor American General George Washington in the newly established State of New York. The village developed slower than the town of Argyle and was officially established on 27 March 1838.  From 1806 to 1906, the Washington County Clerk's Office, because of Argyle's central location in the county, resided within the Village. From 1870 to 1906 the Clerk's Office was located in the brick building now occupied by the Argyle branch of Glens Falls National Bank.

Geography
According to the United States Census Bureau, the village has a total area of 0.4 square miles (0.9 km2), all land.

Argyle is located on NY Route 40; a north-south state highway which runs through both the town and village of Argyle. NY Route 197, an east-west state highway, crosses the Hudson River at nearby Fort Edward and ends in the village at a junction with NY Route 40. The Moses Kill, a stream where early settlers built small mills, flows through the village crossing underneath NY Route 197 before eventually emptying into the Hudson River, south of Fort Edward.

Demographics

As of the census of 2000, there were 289 people, 118 households, and 80 families residing in the village. The population density was 810.9 people per square mile (310.0/km2). There were 132 housing units at an average density of 370.4 per square mile (141.6/km2). The racial makeup of the village was 97.92% White, 0.35% Black or African American, 1.73% from other races. Hispanic or Latino of any race were 2.08% of the population.

There were 118 households, out of which 30.5% had children under the age of 18 living with them, 53.4% were married couples living together, 11.0% had a female householder with no husband present, and 31.4% were non-families. 25.4% of all households were made up of individuals, and 12.7% had someone living alone who was 65 years of age or older. The average household size was 2.45 and the average family size was 2.94.

In the village, the population was spread out, with 24.6% under the age of 18, 8.3% from 18 to 24, 26.0% from 25 to 44, 23.2% from 45 to 64, and 18.0% who were 65 years of age or older. The median age was 39 years. For every 100 females, there were 103.5 males. For every 100 females age 18 and over, there were 96.4 males.

The median income for a household in the village was $36,500, and the median income for a family was $41,667. Males had a median income of $24,792 versus $26,563 for females. The per capita income for the village was $18,396. About 8.8% of families and 10.5% of the population were below the poverty line, including 16.7% of those under the age of eighteen and 3.9% of those 65 or over.

References

External links
 Town of Argyle
 Village of Argyle
 Argyle businesses and organizations
 Historic house in Argyle village

Villages in New York (state)
Glens Falls metropolitan area
Villages in Washington County, New York